Top Country Albums is a chart that ranks the top-performing country music albums in the United States, published by Billboard.  In 1983, four different albums topped the chart, which was at the time published under the title Top Country LPs, based on sales reports submitted by a representative sample of stores nationwide.

The top of the chart was dominated in 1983 by the band Alabama, which spent 35 weeks at number one during the course of the year.  At the start of the year the band held the top spot with its album Mountain Music, which had already spent 14 weeks at number one the previous year and added a further 14 in 1983.  Its total of 28 weeks atop the country albums listing tied the record set by the band with its previous album Feels So Right in 1982.   One week after Mountain Music was displaced from number one, the band was back in the top spot with its next album, The Closer You Get..., which spent 21 weeks atop the chart.  Alabama would go on to become the most successful country act of the 1980s, with ten number one LPs during the decade, a run interrupted only by the seasonal album Christmas in 1985.  Mountain Music was the band's best-selling LP, selling over 5 million copies.

Two albums not by Alabama reached the top spot during the year.  The first was Pancho & Lefty, a collaborative LP by two of country's most successful solo artists, Merle Haggard and Willie Nelson, which first topped the chart for a single week in April, interrupting what would otherwise have been a continuous run at number one by Alabama from the start of the year into July.  It made four returns to the top of the chart, each time displacing Alabama's The Closer You Get..., for an eventual total of eight weeks at number one.  In the issue of Billboard dated October 29, Kenny Rogers reached number one with Eyes That See in the Dark, which retained the top spot for the remainder of the year.  The album relied heavily on the songwriting of Barry Gibb of the pop group the Bee Gees, who was also involved in its production, and was strongly pop-music influenced.  It featured the track "Islands in the Stream", a duet with Dolly Parton, which reached number one on the all-genres Billboard Hot 100, and in 2005 topped a poll run by country music television channel CMT of the best country duets of all time.  Every act that reached number one on the country LPs listing in 1983 has been inducted into the Country Music Hall of Fame; Nelson was the first to be inducted, in 1993, followed by Haggard in 1994, Alabama in 2005, and Rogers in 2013.

Chart history

References

1983
1983 record charts